Lex Lang (born November 12, 1965) is an American voice actor and voice director, who has provided voices and served as a director for a number of animations and video games. He is best known for voicing Doctor Neo Cortex in the Crash Bandicoot series and Goemon Ishikawa in Lupin the Third.

Early life
Lang was born in Hollywood, California on November 12, 1965. He began performing at 7 years old, he would host his own radio show and master of ceremonies for Seagram’s National Comedy Competition.

Throughout high school, Lang has acted in various theatre productions at the Community Theatre in Scottsdale, Arizona. His stage credits include, The Fantastiks, Bus Stop, The Apple Tree, Of Mice and Men and Rogers and Hammerstein’s, Cinderella.

While attending college, he performed stand-up comedy and did impressions for various clubs including The Comedy Store, Dr. Giggles, The NFL Cub, Anderson’s Fifth Estate and The Improv. He would perform along with Jim Carrey, Richard Belzer, and David Spade. He would later move back to Hollywood, California to study music at the Musician's Institute before pursuing voice acting in 1996.

Career
A two-time Daytime Entertainment Emmy® Awards-honored voice actor, (first for his portrayal of Professor Behdety in the 2003/2004 season of Tutenstein, then again as The Doorman and his dog Hundley on the 2009/2010 season of Curious George), he has been in hundreds of productions ranging from original animation, anime, video games, celebrity voice matching, and movie trailers. He is known for playing the voice of Doctor Neo Cortex in the Crash Bandicoot series, replacing Clancy Brown. He is also known for his anime voice work playing roles such as Sagara Sanosuke from Rurouni Kenshin and Goemon Ishikawa XIII in the Lupin III franchise.

Lang has worked as voice director for clients including Cartoon Network, EWAM, Sony, Bang Zoom! Entertainment, Technicolor, PCB Productions, Microsoft, Xbox 360, Code Masters, HBO and Warner Brothers.

Personal life
Lang is married to fellow voice actress Sandy Fox. They live in Studio City, California.

Lang is also a musician, he has played guitar, bass and the piano. He has also written 200 different songs for various genres.

Other ventures
In 1998 Lang and his wife co-founded the Love Planet Foundation, a non-profit organization which creates educational materials for children on the importance of recycling, world water awareness, and the preservation of the planet. They also created Love Planet Productions, which includes several multimedia projects such as anime presentation shows, toddler shows and products, and Zen programming. In 2006 they launched a bottled spring water business called H2Om Water with Intention, which has received recognition as a sponsor at several events including Sting's Rainforest Foundation Carnegie Hall Concert and the Elevate Film Festival. Lang was also a Deepak Chopra meditation instructor.

Filmography

Anime

Animation

Film

Video games

Live-action

Other appearances

References

 Book references

External links 
 
 Love Planet Records
 
 
 

Living people
20th-century American male actors
21st-century American male actors
American male screenwriters
American male television writers
American male video game actors
American male voice actors
American television writers
American voice directors
Businesspeople from Los Angeles
Male actors from Hollywood, Los Angeles
People from Studio City, Los Angeles
Screenwriters from California
1965 births